The Pekin Formation is a Late Triassic (Carnian) geological formation in North Carolina. The Pekin Formation is specific to the Sanford Sub-Basin of the Deep River Basin of North Carolina, although it may be equivalent to the Stockton Formation of Pennsylvania, New Jersey, and New York. The Pekin Formation was deposited in a rift basin along the Atlantic margin of North America during the breakup of the supercontinent Pangaea during the Late Triassic. The most common rocks in the Pekin Formation are red to brown sandstones, representing a terrestrial fluvial (riverine) and floodplain environment in a hot, humid climate. It has yielded both abundant plant and animal fossils, including some of the oldest potential dinosaur footprints in the world and the large predatory crocodylomorph Carnufex carolinensis.

Description and history
On the surface, the Pekin Formation is exposed only as a long, narrow strip along the western edge of the Sanford Sub-basin. It is both the oldest and stratigraphically lowest formation in the sub-basin. As such, it unconformably overlies the much older eroded and metamorphosed Proterozoic to Cambrian aged metasediments and metavolcanic rocks of the Piedmont. The upper boundary grades into the overlying Cumnock Formation, distinguished by its fine-grained grey lacustrine sediments. The Pekin Formation was deposited in a half-graben that formed as part of a series of rift basins that make up the Newark Supergroup during the breakup of the supercontinent Pangaea and subsequent opening of the Atlantic Ocean.

As originally defined by Marius R. Campbell and Kent W. Kimball in 1923, the Pekin Formation spanned the entirety of the lower Deep River Basin, encompassing the lowest sedimentary units of the neighbouring Durham and the Wadesboro sub-basins. In fact, the Pekin Formation was named after the village of Pekin located in the Wadesboro Sub-basin, as this was where Campbell and Kimball (1923) considered it to be best exposed. However, although the three sub-basins share a broadly similar three-part stratigraphy, geologists have not been able to accurately correlate those of the Sanford Sub-basin with the other sub-basins due to variations in stratigraphy, lithology and biostratigraphy. Furthermore, the Pekin has a very similar lithology to the Sandford Formation, and are only distinguishable by the presence of the Cumnock Formation between them. As such, the Pekin, Cumnock and Sanford formations have been restricted to just the Sanford Sub-basin where they can be recognised.

In 2016, Robert E. Weems, Lawrence H. Tanner, and Spencer G. Lucas proposed that the Pekin Formation should be subsumed into the Stockton Formation. Rather than dividing the Newark Supergroup into numerous distinct formations localised in single basins, they proposed a system where the disparate formations of local basins were merged into fewer regional-scale formations, based upon overall similar lithologies, biostratigraphy and chronology. Under this scheme, the Pekin Formation is equivalent to and is synonymous with the Stockton Formation. The Pekin Formation could then be considered an informal name for the Stockton Formation exposed in the Sanford Sub-basin.

Geology
This unit has been interpreted as alluvial fan deposits made up of material derived from the Piedmont to the west flowing down in a southeasterly direction. The remainder of the Pekin Formation is made up of red to brown and purple sandstones, siltstones and mudstones, along with deposits of conglomerate and shale that altogether support a fluvial and floodplain deposition environment. Unlike the lowest layers, sedimentation for the rest of the Pekin Formation had switched to a source in the highlands to the southeast, with rivers and streams in the upper Pekin flowing towards the north and northwest. The overall climate is interpreted as being warm and humid with highly seasonal rainfall.

Clays from the Pekin Formation have been used extensively for the production of pottery, bricks and tiles, namely the Boren and Pomona pits. These two quarries have historically been the site of fossil discoveries, preserving both plants and animals, as well as trace fossils, although these quarries are now disused and some have filled with water. However, excavations by palaeontologists have been continued in a new brick quarry (Merry Oaks Quarry) by the North Carolina Museum of Natural Sciences (NCMNS) at a site labelled NCPALEO 1902. These excavations have uncovered various new vertebrate fossil discoveries, including the relatively complete remains of new Triassic archosaurs.

The age of the Pekin Formation has been estimated based on biostratigraphy and magnetostratigraphy to the Late Carnian (or Tuvalian), supported by correlations with faunas in western North America.

Paleobiota

A variety of plant and vertebrate fossils have been recovered from the Pekin Formation, the including partial skeletons of large vertebrates. The Boren pits preserves abundant plant megafossils, most commonly cycads and bennettitales, as well as horsetails, various ferns and conifers. Some of the most notable finds include an intact specimen of the early palm-like cycad Leptocycas gracilis, as well as a new species of the bennettitale Williamsonia, W. carolinensis, that preserves rare reproductive organs and suggests that it and the leaf Eoginkgoites belong to the same plant.

Invertebrate fossils from the Boren pits include conchostracans (clam shrimps) and clams, as well as numerous Scoyenia burrow trace fossils likely made by a crayfish-like decapod. Vertebrate remains are more common in the Pomona pit, which has preserved the fragmentary remains of archosaurs, phytosaurs, and synapsids, as well as fish bones and scales. Fossil footprints and trackways of tetrapods have also been recorded from the Pomona pit (with a single print from the Boren pit), including bipedal three-toed footprints that may have been made by early dinosaurs.

Only vertebrate fossils are known from the upper Pekin NCPALEO 1902 locality, and include a variety of archosaurs and synapsids typical of Late Triassic North America. The vertebrate fauna of the Pekin Formation has been used to correlate it with strata in western North America, such as the Chinle Formation, with some genera (e.g. Placerias, Coahomasuchus) being shared between eastern and western North America.

Archosauromorphs

Other archosauromorphs

Phytosaurs

Pseudosuchians

Synapsids

See also
 List of dinosaur-bearing rock formations

References

Carnian Stage
Geologic formations of North Carolina
Triassic geology of North Carolina